Mac Cassin (born July 19, 1991) is an American professional racing cyclistand is the current Points Race National Champion.

While attending the University of Colorado Boulder he won 5 Collegiate National Titles on the track between 2011 and 2015 (3 Individual Pursuit, 1 Points Race, 1 Omnium).  

After taking a solo win at the Glencoe Grand Prix in 2015  he was offered a spot on Champion Systems p/b Stan's No Tubes to ride the men's team time trial at the 2015 UCI Road World Championships. 

After undergoing back surgery in March 2016 he was named to the US National Team for the 2016 Pan American Track Cycling Championships where he competed in the Individual Pursuit and Points Race.

In 2017, Cassin was crowned the US National Points Race Champion after placing second in both the Team Pursuit and Individual Pursuit.

Major results

Road
2014
10th - Stage 1 Vuelta a Guatemala - UCI 2.2
2015 
 1st - Glencoe Grand Prix - NCC
 4th - Stage 3 Redlands Bicycle Classic - NRC

Elite Track
2016
 2nd  Team Pursuit
 3rd  Individual Pursuit
2017
 Points Race
 2nd  Team Pursuit
 2nd  Individual Pursuit

References

1991 births
Living people
American male cyclists
Place of birth missing (living people)